Bathsheba at her Bath is an oil on canvas painting executed c.1720 by the Venetian artist Sebastiano Ricci which is in the collection of the Museum of Fine Arts, Budapest. A common subject amongst artists, this was the first of two of Ricci's depictions of the theme.

The painting depicts the Biblical story (as narrated in ) of the seduction of Bathsheba, the wife of Uriah the Hittite, by the Israelite king, David. In the painting Bathsheba, attended by four maidservants, is taking a ritual bath in the open air whilst being observed by King David from his nearby palace roof. In common with other artists Ricci portrays Bathsheba as somewhat vain and promiscuous, thereby excusing David's subsequent immoral behaviour, which was to send her a letter inviting her to his quarters and making her pregnant.

As in the other Ricci work, the background is composed of columns and balconies and the painting uniformly illuminated with light with very little shade. Bathsheba's vanity is exemplified by the way she is looking into a mirror and David's kingship by the fact that he is wearing a crown.

In Ricci's later reworking of the subject, the image of David is replaced by one of his messenger.

See also
 100 Great Paintings

Reference

1720s paintings
Paintings depicting Bathsheba
Nude art
Paintings by Sebastiano Ricci
Bathing in art